Trevor Wittman (born March 5, 1974) is an American boxing and mixed martial arts coach.

Training career
Compelled to retire from boxing after being diagnosed with a hyperinflated lung, Wittman transitioned to training boxers in the Denver metropolitan area. He founded T's K.O. Fight Club in Wheat Ridge, Colorado in March 1998. The business broadened its scope to include other combat sports such as mixed martial arts, eventually resulting in Wittman closing T's K.O. Fight Club and establishing the Grudge Training Center facility in Wheat Ridge in 2009. Grudge relocated to Arvada, Colorado in 2013. Having developed experience working with and making training equipment for fighters, in 2015 Wittman founded ONX Sports, a combat sports equipment company. To focus more attention on ONX Sports, Wittman closed down Grudge in November 2016, though he continues to train a few select fighters, including Rose Namajunas, Justin Gaethje, and Kamaru Usman.

Personal life
Wittman wrestled at Berlin High School, after which he moved to New Jersey, then to Colorado, where he attended the Colorado Institute of Art. Wittman married wife Christina in 2005, and has a son and a daughter.

Notable fighters trained

Mixed martial arts
 Aspen Ladd
 Kamaru Usman
 Rose Namajunas
 Justin Gaethje
 Stipe Miocic
 T.J. Dillashaw
 Donald Cerrone
 Georges St-Pierre
 Neil Magny
 Matt Mitrione
 Roy Nelson
 Tyler Toner
 Gerald Harris
 Pat Barry
 Tyler Stinson
 Luke Caudillo 
 James McSweeney
 Todd Duffee
 Jon Madsen
 Jared Hamman
 Ed Herman
 Justin Salas
 Brandon Thatch
 Rashad Evans
 Shane Carwin
 Melvin Guillard
 Brandon Girtz
 Nate Marquardt
 Duane Ludwig
 Cody Donovan
 Alvin Robinson
 Bobby Lashley
 Keith Jardine
 Paul Buentello
 Justin Wren
 Kevin Burns
 Mike Wessel

Boxers
 Manuel Perez
 Verno Phillips
 Juan Carlos Candelo
 DeAndrey Abron
 DaVarryl Williamson

Awards
World MMA Awards
2017 The Shawn Tompkins Coach of the Year
2019 – July 2020 The Shawn Tompkins Coach of the Year
2021 The Shawn Tompkins Coach of the Year
Voting period for 2019 awards ran from January 2019 to July 2020 due to the COVID-19 pandemic. Subsequently, the voting period for 2021 awards ran from July 2020 to July 2021.
MMAjunkie.com
2021 Coach of the Year
Yahoo! Sports
2021 Coach of the Year
Combat Press
2021 Coach of the Year

References

External links
Trevor Wittman on Myspace

Boxers from Denver
American boxing trainers
Mixed martial arts trainers
1974 births
Living people
American male boxers